Supertalent Group, originally known as the Supertalent of the World or Suta Group, headquartered in Seoul and Singapore, is recognized a talent management and global events organizer as well as travel trade and education specialist. Miss Supertalent and Supertalent Fashion Week are the event and awards brands of Suta Group and expanded to numerous locations throughout the globe.

Miss Supertalent
A twice-yearly, a global television & media superstar event since 2011, held for 13 times, it was held Eiffel Tower of Paris to Ferrari Auto of Italy Cannes, Milan, Venice to Waldorf Rome, promoted as Influencer Tourism Experts by TRIPADVISOR & VIATOR on BBC, CNN, New York Times, Washington Post+.

Several top models have been discovered at the competition, notable examples being  Meriam George(Egypt), Milett Figueroa(Peru),  Maria Sten(Denmark), Diana Arno(Estonia), Malina Joshi(Nepal), Lada Akimova(Russia), Chloe Veitch(UK), Natali Varchenko(Ukraine)

Supertalent Fashion Week
A unit of Miss Supertalent, known as Korea International Fashion Week, collaborate with industry leaders glocal governments, it was held at the Korea International Exhibition Center, Daegu Textile Complex, Incheon International Airport, Eiffel Tower, Galeries Lafayette, Paris, Jungfrau, Schilthorn, Interlaken, Ferrari museum, Modena, Galleria Vittorio Emanuele II, Milan

Supertalent Star Record
Supertalent Group in collaboration with Challenge Headquarters had launched Supertalent World Record which is world's authority on record-breaking achievements to best global performance ever recorded and officially verified in a specific skills and human achievement of entertainment, sports, politician and 4th industrial entertainment solutions. Psy, Ban Ki-moon, Song Hae, Hong Soo-hwan, Jin Yong, Cho Yong-pil, Park Chan-ho, Lee Seung-yuop, Jang Mi-ran, Cho Yong-pil and other winners were awarded Supertalent World Record.

Supertalent Art School
A joint-venture partnership with Born Star, operating 15 campuses both in Korea, China and USA, alumni including a member of Infinite, Kara, Hello Venus, Kim Yu-mi (beauty pageant titleholder) and Girl's Day, with leadership Dean Kim Tae-won, leading rock bands, Boohwal and Shin Goo, South Korean actor, Suta Art School is a global entertainment School in Korea exclusively created for vocal, dancing, acting, hair, make-up.

Supertalent Destination Management
With offices n Seoul, Tokyo, Shanghai, Hong Kong, Taipei and Singapore. European specialist, Suta Group is a European education specialist, wholesale European travel provider to place technology.

Supertalent O2O eCommerce
Supertalent Corporation, collaboration with Idewar in launching an online-to-offline ('O2O') "FREEVOTE.KR" new entertainment voting solution through their respective sub-brands, MYSUPERTALENT, to bring new experience to consumers in South Korean market.

Joint ventures
Suta Group operates joint ventures with Yuuzoo Corporation
 a Singapore listed social media company in four key E-commerce, E-commerce payment system, Online gaming, and Social network, all work to develop fashion, beauty and gaming contents in their respective businesses. Suta Group has also partnered with The Times Group, a flagship company Bennett, Coleman and Company Limited (BCCL).

Partnership
As of October 2021:

 Museum Enzo Ferrari
 Société d'Exploitation de la Eiffel Tower
 Los Angeles Fashion Week
 Vancouver Fashion Week
 Yuuzoo Corporation 
 World Electronic Sports Games by AliSports, Yuuzoo
 Relativity Media by Yuuzoo
 The Times Group
 Fashion One
 Goyang International Flower Festival
 Supertalent Fashion Week
 Supertalent Art School

References

External links
 

Companies based in Seoul
Film distributors of South Korea
Film production companies of South Korea
Pop record labels
Entertainment companies of South Korea